Anolis nigrolineatus is a species of lizard in the family Dactyloidae. The species is found in Ecuador.

References

Anoles
Reptiles described in 1965
Endemic fauna of Ecuador
Reptiles of Ecuador
Taxa named by Ernest Edward Williams